Chris Lewis and Russell Simpson defeated David Graham and Laurie Warder to win the 1983 Benson and Hedges Open doubles competition.

Seeds
A champion seed is indicated in bold text while text in italics indicates the round in which that seed was eliminated.

  John Alexander /  Phil Dent (first round)
  Scott McCain /  Bernard Mitton (first round)
  Rod Frawley /  Jeff Simpson (semifinals)
  David Graham /  Laurie Warder (final)

Draw

References

External links

ATP Auckland Open
1983 Grand Prix (tennis)